WLFP (94.1 FM) is a country music radio station. It is licensed to Germantown, Tennessee, and serves the Memphis area. WLFP broadcasts in HD.

WLFP is a Class C2 FM station that transmits with an ERP of 50,000 watts from a tower just south of the Mississippi state line, near Olive Branch, Mississippi, and its studios are located in Southeast Memphis.

History

Rock (1978-1979) 
The station's original owner was Sam Phillips, who founded Memphis' Sun Records in the 1950s, and is credited with discovering Elvis Presley. The station was originally WLVS-FM (named in honor of Elvis Presley) and had offered a Rock music format when it signed on in 1978, when it was at 94.3.

Country (1979-1983) 
In 1979, the station flipped to a country format.

Beautiful music (1983-1989) 
It flipped to Beautiful music as WEZI in 1983.

Oldies (1989-1993) 
The station changed to an oldies format as WODZ. By 1992, they would switch frequencies to 94.1.

Country (1993-2001) 
In February 1993, they would go Country as WOGY with the branding of "Froggy 94," and they would continue in that direction into the new millennium.

However, after Entercom bought the station in 2000, change was in the air at 94.1. While it was rumored that the station would flip from country by the holidays, the format remained into the new year.

Modern adult contemporary (2001-2006) 
On January 24, 2001, at 10:05 a.m., "Froggy" signed off with "All the Good Ones Are Gone" by Pam Tillis, and 94.1 began stunting with the sound of a ticking clock. At 2:35 p.m., after a few delays (including a technical glitch that resulted in the "Froggy" format briefly returning for a brief stopset, only to revert back to the clock sound), they flipped to Modern AC as "94.1 The Buzz", with the callsign soon changed to WMBZ. The first song on "The Buzz" was "Even Flow" by Pearl Jam.

While at the outset the change did attract a lot of listener attention, the effect was not as long-lived as Entercom would hope. While The Buzz did manage to sound the death knell for then-WKSL and spark minor format tweaks at then-rival WMC-FM, overall it was not enough.

Rhythmic (2006-2008) 
On October 27, 2006, at 5 p.m., the station began stunting with a robotic countdown (using Microsoft Sam) to 10 a.m. on the following Monday, October 30 (as well as airing occasional non-sequiturs in between numbers). At the time promised, 94.1 flipped to Rhythmic AC as WSNA, "Snap! 94.1, The Rhythm Of Memphis", with the first song on "Snap!" being "Let's Get It Started" by The Black Eyed Peas.

Classic hits (2008-2014) 
On October 17, 2008, at 2 p.m., after playing "Bye Bye Bye" by 'N Sync, WSNA flipped to classic hits as "Classic Hits 94.1 KQK". The station's call letters were changed to WKQK. The first song played on "94.1 KQK" was Bob Seger's "Old Time Rock and Roll." The station's playlist consisted of music from the 1960s, 1970s, and early 1980s. The new format's morning team would include long-time WMC-FM hosts Steve Conley and Karen Perrin.

Country (2014-present) 
On September 26, 2014, at 6 p.m., after playing "Last Dance" by Donna Summer, WKQK flipped back to country as "94.1 The Wolf". The first song on "The Wolf" was "This Is How We Roll" by Florida-Georgia Line. On October 3, WKQK changed their call letters to WLFP to go with the "Wolf" branding.

References

External links

LFP
Germantown, Tennessee
Audacy, Inc. radio stations